The 1944 United States Senate election in Ohio took place on November 7, 1944. Incumbent Republican Senator Robert A. Taft, first elected in the Republican wave of 1938, was narrowly elected to a second term in office over Democratic former Lieutenant Governor William G. Pickrel, winning 71 of Ohio's 88 counties. Despite Pickrel winning the state's largest urban centers such as Cleveland, his margins there were overcome by Taft's strong showings in the rural areas and small towns. Nevertheless, at less than a point, Taft's victory was significantly smaller then his 7 point win in 1938.

Background
Senator Taft unsuccessfully sought the Republican presidential nomination in 1940 and was a national leader of the party's conservative wing. He was an isolationist before the Attack on Pearl Harbor, then he changed his mind and supported Congress' bipartisan effort to pass wartime appropriations for World War 2. In 1944, Taft decided to be a candidate for re-election before considering future presidential runs.

Democratic primary

Candidates
Marvin C. Harrison
William G. Pickrel, attorney and former Lieutenant Governor of Ohio (1928, 1931–33)
John Taylor

Results

General election

Results

By county

See also 
 1944 United States Senate elections

References

1944
Ohio
United States Senate